Dôme de l'Arpont is a mountain of Savoie, France. It lies in the Massif de la Vanoise range. It has an elevation of 3,601 metres above sea level.

Alpine three-thousanders
Mountains of the Graian Alps
Mountains of Savoie